Kévin Dinal (born 13 April 1993) is a French professional basketball player for Nantes of LNB Pro B.

On 22 June 2014 he signed with Souffelweyersheim. Dinal averaged 10.5 points, 7.7 rebounds and 1.3 assists per game.

On 6 July 2015 Dinal signed with JDA Dijon. He averaged 3.5 points and 2.6 rebounds per game.

On 10 June 2016 he signed with Orléans.

Dinal joined JL Bourg on 21 July 2017. He returned to Orléans on 4 August 2021.

References 

1993 births
Living people
ADA Blois Basket 41 players
French men's basketball players
JDA Dijon Basket players
JL Bourg-en-Bresse players
Orléans Loiret Basket players
Basketball players from Paris
Power forwards (basketball)